Brecker is a surname. Notable people with the surname include:

 Randy Brecker (b. 1945), American musician, brother of Michael
 Michael Brecker (1949–2007), American musician, brother of Randy
 Allison Shearmur (née Brecker; 1963–2018), American film executive and producer

See also
Brecher